Acanthermia is a genus of moths of the family Noctuidae.

Species

 Acanthermia anubis
 Acanthermia atomosa
 Acanthermia atriluna
 Acanthermia basimochla
 Acanthermia bathildes
 Acanthermia brunnea
 Acanthermia carbonelli
 Acanthermia concatenalis
 Acanthermia didactica
 Acanthermia discata
 Acanthermia dyari Hampson, 1926
 Acanthermia guttata
 Acanthermia hebes
 Acanthermia incisura
 Acanthermia inculta
 Acanthermia infraalba
 Acanthermia insulsa
 Acanthermia iphis
 Acanthermia juvenis
 Acanthermia latris
 Acanthermia librata
 Acanthermia longistriata
 Acanthermia madrina
 Acanthermia medara
 Acanthermia mediana
 Acanthermia missionum
 Acanthermia modesta
 Acanthermia nigripalpis
 Acanthermia orthogonia
 Acanthermia palearis
 Acanthermia pallida
 Acanthermia paloma
 Acanthermia pantina
 Acanthermia parca
 Acanthermia perfasciata
 Acanthermia pupillata
 Acanthermia regia
 Acanthermia renicula
 Acanthermia sabata
 Acanthermia samia
 Acanthermia stigmaphiles
 Acanthermia stigmatica
 Acanthermia subclara
 Acanthermia taltula
 Acanthermia umbrata
 Acanthermia valida
 Acanthermia velutipuncta
 Acanthermia xanthopterygia

References
Natural History Museum Lepidoptera genus database

Calpinae
Noctuoidea genera